The Aviomania G2SA Genesis Duo is a Cypriot autogyro designed in 2007 by Nicolas Karaolides and produced by Aviomania of Larnaca. The aircraft is supplied as a complete ready-to-fly-aircraft or as a kit for amateur construction.

Design and development
The G2SA Genesis Duo features a single main rotor, a two-seats-in tandem open cockpit with a windshield, tricycle landing gear with wheel pants, plus a tail caster and a twin cylinder, air and liquid-cooled, four-stroke, dual-ignition, turbocharged  Rotax 914 engine in pusher configuration. Other engine options include the  Rotax 503 and the  Rotax 912 ULS.

The aircraft fuselage is made from bolted-together aluminum tubing and is equipped with a composite fairing.

The ready-to-fly version comes with the Rotax 503 as standard equipment. The kit version does not include the engine, propeller or main rotor pre-rotator.

Specifications (G2SA Genesis Duo)

See also
List of rotorcraft

References

External links

Genesis Duo G2SA
2000s Cypriot sport aircraft
2000s Cypriot ultralight aircraft
2000s Cypriot civil utility aircraft
Homebuilt aircraft
Single-engined pusher autogyros